Egon Johansen (9 November 1919 – 11 May 1999) was a Danish field hockey player. He competed in the men's tournament at the 1948 Summer Olympics.

References

External links
 

1919 births
1999 deaths
Danish male field hockey players
Olympic field hockey players of Denmark
Field hockey players at the 1948 Summer Olympics
People from Kalundborg
Sportspeople from Region Zealand